A ranged weapon is any weapon that can engage targets beyond hand-to-hand distance, i.e. at distances greater than the physical reach of the user holding the weapon itself.  The act of using such a weapon is also known as shooting.  It is sometimes also called projectile weapon or missile weapon because it typically works by launching solid projectiles ("missiles"), though technically a fluid-projector (which throws out pressurized streams of liquid or even gas) and a directed-energy weapon (which does not involve any tangible projectile) are also ranged weapons.  In contrast, a weapon intended to be used in hand-to-hand combat is called a melee weapon.

Ranged weapons give the attacker an advantage (especially when performing an ambush) because the target is often getting hit from beyond immediate visual range, therefore making it more difficult for the defenders to react and hitting back effectively.  It also puts distance between the attacker and the opponent, which is a safer combat option since the close physical contact during melee fights often puts the attacker within the immediate striking range of enemy counterattacks and thus at an equal risk of getting hurt or killed.

The line between ranged and melee weapons is not entirely definite; for instance, spears, axes, daggers, and knives can be used for both throwing and hand-to-hand combat, depending on purpose and situation, and a ranged weapon can also be used as a melee weapon in close encounters, such as the buttstock of a rifle used for butt-stroking, a rifle with a bayonet fixed to the front end used as an improvised spear, a handgun used for pistol-whipping, and even an arrow being used as a hand pick in desperate situations.

Early ranged weapons often included specifically designed hand-thrown weapons such as darts, javelins, slings, as well as elastic weapons such as slingshots, bows and crossbows; and more complex siege engines like stone throwers, catapults, ballistas and trebuchets.  These ranged weapons were extremely effective in ancient and early medieval warfare, especially when used en masse, as they gave the wielder an opportunity to launch multiple rounds of attack before an enemy armed with melee weapons or shorter-ranged missile weapons could even get close enough to pose a threat. After the invention of gunpowder and the development of firearms, gun-type pneumatic ranged weapons became the dominant weapon of choice in armed conflicts, even in close combat. In modern warfare, ranged weaponry is also used both tactically and strategically in the form of long-range artilleries, rockets and guided missiles. The maximum effective range of a weapon is the greatest distance from which the weapon can be fired while still consistently inflicting casualties or damage. When a modern missile can be launched from beyond the effective range of counterattack, it is termed a standoff missile.

List of ranged weapons

Prehistoric, ancient, and medieval period 

 Hand-thrown
 Barehanded
 Bolas
 Dart
 Plumbata
 Spear
 Swiss arrow
 Throwing axe
 Francisca
 Hunga Munga
 Hurlbat
 Mbanja
 Nzappa zap
 Tomahawk
 Throwing knife
 Throwing stick
 Boomerang
 Knobkierrie
 Rungu
 Valari
 Leverage-enhanced
 Amentum
 Atlatl (spear-thrower)
 Kestros
 Sling
 Woomera
 Elastic propulsion
 Bow
 Crossbow
 Repeating crossbow
 Cheiroballistra
 Slingshot
 Pneumatic
 Blowgun
 Explosive propulsion
 Fire lance
 Hand cannon (e.g. Heilongjiang hand cannon, Xanadu Gun)
 Cetbang
 Arquebus
 Tanegashima
 Swivel gun
 Rocket propulsion
 Fire arrow
 Huolongchushui
 Siege weapon
 Via mechanical leverage
 Mangonel
 Trebuchet / couillard
 Via elasticity
 Catapult
 Bed crossbow
 Onager
 Ballista
 Scorpion
 Polybolos
 Via Explosive propulsion
 Cannon (e.g. Wuwei Bronze Cannon)
 Bombard (e.g. Faule Grete, Faule Mette, Pumhart von Steyr, Grose Bochse)
 Mortar

Early modern period 

 Pneumatic-propelled
 Airgun (e.g. Girandoni air rifle)
 Explosive-propelled
 Musket
 Wheellock
 Snaplock / snaphance / miquelet lock
 Doglock
 Flintlock
 Che Dian Chong
 Pistol
 Blunderbuss
 Musketoon
 Wall gun
 Field gun
 Culverin / demi-culverin
 Hongyipao
 Hand mortar
 Coehorn
 Zamburak
 Hwacha
 Breech-loading swivel gun
 Siege cannon (e.g. Abus Gun, Dardanelles Gun, and Tsar Cannon)

Late modern and contemporary period 

Most modern projectile weapons fall into the broader category of either direct fire or indirect fire, with the former often being regarded as guns and the latter as artillery. While some are small and light enough to be operated by individuals (i.e. small arms and grenade launchers), most require a team of individuals to service, maneuver and operate.

 Small arms and light weapons
 Handgun
 Derringer
 Harmonica gun
 Revolver
 Semi-automatic pistol
 Machine pistol
 Long gun
 Rifled musket
 Shotgun
 Rifle
 Single-shot rifle
 Repeating rifle (e.g. revolving rifle, carbine, battle rifle, assault rifle, DMR/sniper rifle, etc)
 Submachine gun / personal defense weapon
 Squad automatic weapon / light machine gun
 Grenade launcher
 Crew-served weapon
 Medium machine gun / general purpose machine gun
 Anti-material rifle / anti-tank rifle
 Recoilless rifle
 Heavy weapon and vehicle-mounted weapon systems
 Heavy machine gun
 Autocannon
 Volley gun
 Multiple-barrel firearm
 Gatling gun
 Minigun / Microgun
 Rotary cannon
 Close-in weapon system
 Artillery
 Mortar
 Artillery battery
 Anti-aircraft gun / flak cannon
 Coastal artillery
 Field artillery
 Howitzer / gun howitzer
 Mountain gun
 Anti-tank gun
 Self-propelled artillery
 Tank gun
 Assault gun
 Naval artillery
 Aircraft artillery
 Rocket weaponry
 Rocket launcher
 Rocket-propelled grenade / shoulder-fired missile
 Rocket artillery
 Rocket pod
 Multiple rocket launcher
 Guided missile
 Air-to-air missile
 Air-to-surface missile
 Anti-submarine missile
 Surface-to-air missile
 Man-portable air-defense system 
 Anti-ballistic missile
 Anti-satellite weapon
 Surface-to-surface missile
 Anti-tank guided missile
 Anti-ship missile
 Ballistic missile
 Tactical ballistic missile
 Theater ballistic missile (short-range ballistic missile, medium-range ballistic missile)
 Intermediate-range ballistic missile / long-range ballistic missile
 Intercontinental ballistic missile
 Anti-ship ballistic missile
 Submarine-launched ballistic missile
 Cruise missile
 Submarine-launched cruise missile
 Torpedo
 Flamethrower
 Water cannon / waterjet disruptor
 Aerial weapon
 Loitering munition (expendable warhead as UCAV)

Future and conceptual weapon period 
 High-acceleration linear motor
 Railgun
 Coilgun
 Helical railgun

 Directed energy weapon
 Laser weapon
 Electrolaser
 Pulsed energy projectile
 Dazzler
 Particle-beam weapon
 Microwave weapon
 Sonic weapon

See also
 Trajectory of a projectile
 Siege engine
 List of artillery
 List of missiles
 List of missiles by nation

References

Further reading
 Gray, David (2002) Bows of the World. The Lyons Press. 
 (1992) The Traditional Bowyers Bible Volume 1. The Lyons Press. .
 (1992) The Traditional Bowyers Bible Volume 2. The Lyons Press. .
 (1994) The Traditional Bowyers Bible Volume 3. The Lyons Press. .
 The ballistics of the sling, Thom Richardson, Royal Armouries Yearbook, Volume 3 1998.

External links

Short Bows and Long Bows: Scaling effects in archery
 Sling Weapons—Their evolution
 The Sling – Ancient Weapon
 "Secrets of Lost Empires: Medieval Siege" (building of and history of trebuchets), from the NOVA website
 Modern and Civil War Era Cannon Information (Wayback Machine copy)